Kojo Kankam (born 26 December 1999) is a Ghanaian football defensive midfielder and center defender

Career last club TOp Heroes Fc in Ghana 2021
He played for Ghanaian clubs Asante Kotoko and Ebusua Dwarfs.

Radnički Niš
At the beginning of 2013, he arrived on trial at Radnički Niš. He made his Jelen SuperLiga debut for Radnički Niš in the last fixture of season 2012–13. as a free agent.

References

External links
 
 Kojo Kankam stats at utakmica.rs
Under 20 Ghana national team

1992 births
Living people
Footballers from Kumasi
Association football defenders
Ghanaian footballers
Asante Kotoko S.C. players
King Faisal Babes FC players
Ghana Premier League players
Ghanaian expatriate footballers
Ghanaian expatriate sportspeople in Serbia
Expatriate footballers in Serbia
FK Radnički Niš players
Serbian SuperLiga players